Judith Vizuete Recuenco (born 20 July 1995) is a Spanish female handballer who plays a centre back for Universitatea Cluj-Napoca.

Individual awards
 División de Honor Top Scorer: 2019, 2020

References 

Living people
1995 births
Spanish female handball players
Handball players from Catalonia
Expatriate handball players
Spanish expatriate sportspeople in Romania
Sportspeople from Granollers